Fiona Fuller McFarland (born 1985) is an American U.S. Navy reservist and a state legislator in  Florida. She serves in the Florida House of Representatives representing the 72nd district, which covers parts of Sarasota. She is a member of the Republican Party. McFarland is the daughter of former White House National Security Advisor KT McFarland.

She was elected on November 3, 2020, defeating lawyer Drake Buckman by 9.2 points, (9,285 votes) and assumed the office the next day. She won re-election in 2022.

Military service and political career

McFarland joined the United States Navy in June 2008 after attending the United States Naval Academy, earning a BS in political science and international relations. She served in the navy until 2016, when she then, and still serves in the navy reserves.

In June 2019, McFarland announced that she would be running to unseat the incumbent Democratic representative Margaret Good in the 72nd district of the Florida House of Representative. However, in July 2019, Good announced that she would be running to unseat Vern Buchanan in the race for Florida's 16th congressional district. During the Republican primary, McFarland faced local hospital board member Donna Barcomb and attorney Jason Miller. McFarland widely outspent both primary opponents and narrowly won the primary by 1.2 points (263 votes). She defeated attorney Drake Buckman in the general election.

References

1985 births
Living people
Republican Party members of the Florida House of Representatives
Women state legislators in Florida
21st-century American women politicians
21st-century American politicians
United States Naval Academy alumni
University of North Carolina alumni